Moamba District is a district of Maputo Province in southern Mozambique. Its main town is Moamba. The district is located in the western part of the province, and borders with Magude District in the north, Manhiça and Marracuene Districts in the east, the city of Matola in the southeast, Boane District and Namaacha District in the south, and with Mpumalanga Province of South Africa, in the west. It has a population of 56,335 as of 2007.

Geography
The Incomati River crosses the district from west to east. There are a number of seasonal rivers as well, which only flow during the rainy season.

History
In 1730, the area was populated by Ronga-speaking people and divided between local chiefs. Since 1833, the area was occupied by the Portuguese.

Demographics
As of 2005, 40% of the population of the district was younger than 15 years. 49% of the population spoke Portuguese. The most common mothertongue among the population was Xichangana. 55% were analphabetic, mostly women.

Administrative divisions
The district is divided into four postos, Moamba (one locality), Ressano Garcia (one locality), Pessene (three localities), and Sábiè (five localities).

Economy
9% of the households in the district have access to electricity.

Agriculture
In the district, there are 10,000 farms which have on average  of land. The main agricultural products are corn, cassava, cowpea, peanut, and sweet potato.

Transportation
There is a road network in the district, which includes  of the national road EN4, running between Maputo and Ressano Garcia, as well as secondary roads. A railway between Maputo and Ressano Garcia runs through Moamba; another railway line, between Moamba and Xinavane, is not in operation.

References

Districts in Maputo Province